Sledd may refer to

Places
Sledd, Missouri, an unincorporated community in Pike County, United States
Sledd Hall in the University of Florida, United States

People
Sledd of Essex, 6th century King of Essex 
Andrew Sledd (1870–1939), American theologian 
Antonio J. "Tony" Sledd (1982–2002), U.S. Marine killed in the Faylaka Island attack
William Sledd (born 1983), American video blogger

See also
 SLED (disambiguation)